The 2020–21 Austrian Basketball Superliga was the second season of the Basketball Superliga, the top-tier league in Austrian basketball. It is the 75th season of the first tier of basketball in Austria.

Swans Gmunden won the first Superliga championship, its fifth Austrian title.

Format
Teams first play each other in the regular season home and away. After this, teams ranked 1–6 and 7-10 are divided in two groups to qualify for the playoffs. In the playoffs, the best eight teams play each other for the national championship in best-of-five series. The two lowest placed teams play against the top two teams of the Basketball Zweite Liga (B2L).

Teams

Venues and locations

Regular season

Basic Round

Placement Round

Qualifying round

Austrian clubs in European competitions

References

External links
Official website 

Österreichische Basketball Bundesliga seasons
Austrian
Lea